The Concert Hall Park (Danish: Musikhusparken or Musikhushaven) is a public park in central Aarhus, Denmark. The park is laid out in front of the Aarhus Concert Hall main entrances in the Indre By neighborhood of the inner city. It is bordered by the street Frederiks Allé to the east, Thomas Jensen's Allé to the south and Vester Allé to the north, behind the historic buildings of the former Vester Allés Barracks. The park is named after the Aarhus Concert Hall which is situated prominently immediately west of the park. The Concert Hall Park forms a center-point between some of the most prominent buildings in the city, the ARoS Aarhus Art Museum, Vester Allé Barracks, the concert halls, and Aarhus City Hall in view behind the City Hall Park across Frederiks Allé. The Concert Hall Park was designed by the landscape architect Sven Hansen as a parterre garden, and it was established in the 1980s.

The Concert Hall Park is divided geographically in two separate sections. The main section between Frederiks Allé and the Concert Hall entrances is designed as a parterre garden. The more secluded northward section is fit in between the concert halls and the ARoS art museum on a steep slope, and includes an amphitheatre and outdoor stage. The Concert Hall Park and the adjacent City Hall Park is separated by the Frederiks Allé road and have very different designs. Whereas the City Hall Park has winding paths, dense growth and an organic, sort of haphazard, design, the Concert Hall Park has an ordered, tight expression with straight paths, cropped hedges and diagonal axis' mirroring planning and order. In the central areas where paths join there are a number of fountains and benches.

The amphitheatre and outdoor stage of the Concert Hall Park is used for various events and concerts, including the SPoT Festival and Aarhus Festuge. It can accommodate 5-6000 people, depending on the setup.

Sculptures 
The Concert Hall Park  has a number of sculptures. The best known may be "Hvalikopteren" (The Whalechopper) which Margrethe II of Denmark dubbed "Humpback Gunship" when she saw it for the first time. The sculpture is formed as a metal whale with a helicopter rotor, designed by the Australian artist Benjamin Gilberts for the Danish version of Sculpture by the Sea.

The Danish sculptor Gudrun Steen-Andersen is represented with the bronze sculpture Vokseværk (Growth Pains) from 1989. It is a naturalistic interpretation of young boy placed by the large mirror-pool in front of the concert hall. Gudrun Steen-Andersen's own son modeled for the sculpture and today he teaches at the Royal Academy of Music, Aarhus/Aalborg inside the concert hall. Ejler Bille created the abstract sculpture Saurion which is placed in front of the main entrance to the concert hall. Erik Varming designed and donated an abstract sculpture carved from granite, situated behind the amphitheatre. Anker Hoffman created l'etude or "sitting girl in bronze" which was donated by the bank Sparekassen SDS to the mayor of Aarhus, Orla Hyllested.

Gallery

References

External links 

Parks in Aarhus